Cosmosoma determinata is a moth of the family Erebidae. It was described by Arthur Gardiner Butler in 1876. It is found in Colombia.

References

determinata
Moths described in 1876